The 40th Guillermo Mendoza Memorial Scholarship Foundation Box Office Entertainment Awards (GMMSF-BOEA) is a part of the annual awards in the Philippines held on June 21, 2009. The award-giving body honors Filipino actors, actresses and other performers' commercial success, regardless of artistic merit, in the Philippine entertainment industry.

The yearly event is supposed to be 39th this year, but they believe that it is an unlucky number. Thus they skipped the 39th and renamed the event the 40th instead.

Winners selection
The winners are chosen from the Top 10 Philippine films of 2008, top-rating shows in Philippine television, top recording awards received by singers, and top gross receipts of concerts and performances.

Awards ceremony
On June 21, 2009 at Carlos P. Romulo Auditorium, RCBC Plaza, Ayala Avenue in Makati, Philippines, the 40th Box Office Entertainment Awards night was held. The event was then aired on June 28 on ABS-CBN.

Awards

Major awards
Box Office King - John Lloyd Cruz (A Very Special Love)
Box Office Queen - Sarah Geronimo (A Very Special Love)
Female Concert Performer of the Year - Sarah Geronimo (The Next One)
Female Recording Artist of the Year - Sarah Geronimo (Just Me)
Male Concert Performer of the Year - Gary Valenciano (Gary Live@25)
Male Recording Artist of the Year - Martin Nievera (Milestone)

Film and Television category
Film Actor of the Year - Christopher de Leon (Magkaibigan)
Film Actress of the Year - Sharon Cuneta (Caregiver)
Most Popular Film Director - Cathy Garcia-Molina (A Very Special Love)
Most Popular Screenwriter - Raz Sobida dela Torre (A Very Special Love)
Most Popular Film Producer - Star Cinema
Prince & Princess of Philippine Movies & TV - Richard Gutierrez & KC Concepcion (For The First Time)
Most Popular Child Actor, Movies & TV - Robert "Buboy" Villar (GMA-7)
Most Popular Child Actress, Movies & TV - Sharlene San Pedro (ABS-CBN)
Most Popular Loveteam of Movies & TV - Gerald Anderson & Kim Chiu (ABS-CBN)
Most Popular Television Program - Dyesebel (GMA-7)
Most Popular TV Director - Bb. Joyce Bernal (Dyesebel - GMA-7)
Most Promising Female Star of Movies & TV - KC Concepcion (ABS-CBN)
Most Promising Male Star of Movies & TV - Aljur Abrenica (GMA-7)

Music category
Most Popular Novelty Singer - Moymoy Palaboy
Most Popular Recording Group - Spongecola
Most Promising Performing Group - You've Got Male (Gian Magdangal, Jan Nieto, Harry Santos, and Bryan Termulo)
New Female Recording Artist of the Year (Promising Singer) - KC Concepcion (A.k.a Cassandra)
New Male Recording Artist of the Year (Most Promising Singer) - Bugoy Drilon (Paano Na Kaya?)
Most Popular Dance Group - EB Babes

Special awards
Bert Marcelo Award (for Comedians) - Eugene Domingo
Comedy Box Office King/s - Vic Sotto & Dolphy (Dobol Trobol)
Comedy Box Office Queen - Ai-Ai delas Alas (Ang Tanging Ina N'yong Lahat)
Most Phenomenal Loveteam - Dingdong Dantes & Marian Rivera
Outstanding Global Achievement by a Filipino Artist - Arnel Pineda & Charice
Outstanding/Special Merit Award for Music (Posthumous Award) - Francis Magalona
Valentine Box Office King & Queen - Richard Gutierrez & Marian Rivera (My Best Friend's Girlfriend)

Multiple awards

Individuals with multiple awards 
The following individual names received two or more awards:

*Note: Special Award winners are not included.

Companies with multiple awards 
The following companies received two or more awards in the television category:

References

Box Office Entertainment Awards
2009 film awards
2009 television awards
2009 music awards